"Beats + Pieces" is a single by Coldcut, released in 1987 as the first single from their debut album What's That Noise? 

The song features samples from sources ranging from James Brown, Kurtis Blow and American comedian Flip Wilson.

References

1987 singles
Coldcut songs
1987 songs